Poems from Guantanamo: The Detainees Speak is an anthology of 22 poems by 17 Guantanamo detainees published by Marc Falkoff, a US professor of law with a doctorate in American literature.

Contents 

 They Fight for Peace, Shaker Aamer
 O Prison Darkness, Abdulaziz
 I Shall Not Complain, Abdulaziz
 To My Father, Abdullah Thani Faris al Anazi
 Lions in the Cage, Ustad Badruzzaman Badr
 Homeward Bound, Moazzam Begg
 Death Poem, Jumah al Dossari
 They Cannot Help, Shakih Abdurraheem Muslim Dost
 Cup Poem 1, Shakih Abdurraheem Muslim Dost
 Cup Poem 2, Shakih Abdurraheem Muslim Dost
 Two Fragments, Shakih Abdurraheem Muslim Dost
 First Poem of My Life, Mohammed el Gharani
 Humiliated in the Shackles, Sami al Haj
 The Truth, Emad Abdullah Hassan
 Is It True? Osama Abu Kabir
 Hunger Strike Poem, Adnan Farhan Abdul Latif
 I Am Sorry, My Brother, Othman Abdulraheem Mohammad
 Terrorist 2003, Martin Mubanga
 I Write My Hidden Longing, Abdulla Majid al Noaimi, the Captive of Dignity
 My Heart Was Wounded by the Strangeness, Abdulla Majid al Noaimi, the Captive of Dignity
 Ode to the Sea, Ibrahim al Rubaish
 Even if the Pain, Siddiq Turkestani

See also 
 Shaker Aamer

References

External links 
 Poetry and politics at Guantánamo: An interview with Marc Falkoff, editor of Poems From Guantánamo: The Detainees Speak Andy Worthington October 10, 2010
 Poems from Guantánamo - University of Iowa Press
 Video: Riz Ahmed reads Poems from Guantánamo 

2007 poetry books
American poetry anthologies
Guantanamo Bay detention camp
Books published by university presses